Keith Noyahr is a Sri Lankan journalist. He was the associate editor of The Nation. He often wrote critical analyses of Sri Lanka’s security situation in his column "Military Matters". He was abducted by a white van and was severely beaten for hours before being released in May 2008. Later he fled to Australia.

See also
 Human rights in Sri Lanka
 List of kidnappings
 Enforced disappearances in Sri Lanka

References

Living people
Year of birth missing (living people)
Sri Lankan journalists